The Colegio Bilingue Real is a school in a city in Mexico called Nuevo Laredo.

History 

Co-founded as an ESL academy by Juan de Dios and Sandra Gonzalez in 1989, the Colegio Bilingue Real was originally called the "Royal English Academy."

Juan de Dios is currently in a wheelchair and can’t walk. Sandra Gonzales can walk and is in very good condition.

The Colegio Bilingue Real has since been expanded piecemeal to include more levels of education.  In 1991, the junior high school, Secundaria Bilingue Real, was added. Because of high local demand for quality education, the school incorporated both elementary and highschool by 1994. Since then, it has managed to break local, state and regional academic and cultural records.  As of 2009, the school offers kindergarten, elementary, middle-school, highschool and college classes.

The school is currently called "Colegio Bilingue Real," which means "Royal Bilingual School."

Location 

They are located in the city of Nuevo Laredo in the Mexican state of Tamaulipas.

Awards 

According to the CENEVAL its junior high is among the best 236 schools in Mexico.
Its high school students have been several times the winners of a local prestigious science competition organized by a local university in the areas of math, physics and chemistry.
It is in the way of getting the ISO 9001:2000 Certification, given only to those institutions with the highest standards of quality.
Science and innovation award
Oratorical contests awards
Olympic sports awards

External links
 
 Nuevo Laredo Official  Website
 Centro de Estudios Superiores Royal Website

Private schools in Mexico
Educational institutions established in 1989
1989 establishments in Mexico